Phil Tiernan is an Australian former professional rugby league footballer who played in the 1980s and 1990s. He played for Illawarra and Parramatta in the NSWRL competition.

Playing career
Tiernan made his first grade debut for Illawarra in round 22 of the 1989 NSWRL season against Cronulla at Shark Park. Tiernan would go on to play a further 21 games for Illawarra before departing the club at the end of 1991. In 1992, Tiernan joined Parramatta and played six games for the club over two seasons.

References

Illawarra Steelers players
Parramatta Eels players
Australian rugby league players
Rugby league props
Rugby league second-rows
1967 births
Living people